Elly Appel-Vessies (27 July 1952 - 16 July 2022) was a former professional tennis player from the Netherlands. Since retiring, she played some seniors tennis.

Appel-Vessies' best performance in the singles competition at a Grand Slam championship was at the 1975 French Open when she reached the third round. Her best performance in a doubles tournament at a major was at the 1976 French Open when she and Virginia Ruzici reached the quarterfinals.

She also played 30 times for the Netherlands Fed Cup team, winning 17 matches and losing 13. She helped the team retain its place in the World Group during her time as a professional.

Appel-Vessies died on 16 July 2022 at the age of 69.

Career finals

Singles: 1 (1 title)

Doubles: 1 (1 runner-up)

References

External links
 
 
 

1952 births
2022 deaths
Dutch female tennis players
Sportspeople from Beverwijk
LGBT tennis players
Dutch LGBT sportspeople
20th-century Dutch women
20th-century Dutch people